Márk L. Jedlóczky (born 3 August 1999) is a Hungarian racing driver currently competing in the TCR International Series and FIA Central European Zone Circuit Championship. Having previously competed in the Hungarian FRT Series.

Racing career
Jedlóczky began his career in 2014 in slalom racing, winning in three out of four entered events. In 2015 he switched to the Hungarian FRT Series, he continued in the series for 2016 and finished second in the championship standings that year. For 2017 he switched to the FIA Central European Zone Circuit Championship, he won both his first two races of the season in the D6-5 class of the championship.

In June 2017 it was announced that he would race in the TCR International Series, driving an Alfa Romeo Giulietta TCR for Unicorse Team.

Racing record

Complete TCR International Series results
(key) (Races in bold indicate pole position) (Races in italics indicate fastest lap)

Complete TCR Europe Series results
(key) (Races in bold indicate pole position) (Races in italics indicate fastest lap)

References

External links
 

1999 births
Living people
TCR International Series drivers
Hungarian racing drivers
Sportspeople from Miskolc

Zengő Motorsport drivers
TCR Europe Touring Car Series drivers